The 2014–15 Florida State Seminoles men's basketball team, variously Florida State or FSU, represented Florida State University during the 2014–15 NCAA Division I men's basketball season. Florida State competed in Division I of the National Collegiate Athletic Association (NCAA). The Seminoles were led by thirteenth year head coach Leonard Hamilton and played their home games at the Donald L. Tucker Center on the university's Tallahassee, Florida campus. They were members of the Atlantic Coast Conference.

Florida State finished the season 17–16, 8–10 in ACC play, to finish in a tie for tenth place. They lost in the quarterfinals of the ACC Tournament to Virginia. The Seminoles missed the postseason for the first time in nine years.

Previous season

The Seminoles finished the 2013–14 season 22–14, 9–9 in ACC play in a tie for seventh place. They lost in the quarterfinals of the ACC tournament to Virginia. They were invited to the NIT where they lost in the semifinals to Minnesota.

Pre-season

Departures

Transfers

Recruiting class

Media poll
In the ACC Media Poll, Florida State was picked to finish eighth in the conference.

Roster

Depth chart
Aaron Thomas, a starting guard, was declared by the university to be ineligible for the season.

Honors
ACC Rookie of the Week
Xavier Rathan-Mayes

All-ACC
Honorable Mention
Xavier Rathan-Mayes
Freshman Team
Xavier Rathan-Mayes

All-Americans
Freshman Team
Xavier Rathan-Mayes

Awards
 Kyle Macy Award Finalist
Xavier Rathan-Mayes

Schedule

|-
!colspan=12 style="background:#; color:white;"| Exhibition

|-
!colspan=12 style="background:#; color:white;"| Regular season

|-
!colspan=12 style="background:#; color:white;"| ACC tournament

Media
Florida State basketball is broadcast on the Florida State University Seminoles Radio Network.

References

External links
 Official Team Website
 Media Almanac
 Notes

Florida State
Florida State Seminoles men's basketball seasons